Sidalcea malviflora is a species of flowering plant in the mallow family, known by the common names dwarf checkerbloom, Greek mallow, prairie mallow and dwarf checkermallow.

Distribution
Sidalcea malviflora is native to the West Coast of the United States, from Washington to California, and into northwestern Baja California. It is a common plant of chaparral, coastal sage scrub, and other habitat types.

Description
Sidalcea malviflora is somewhat variable in appearance and there are many subspecies. In general it is a perennial herb growing from a woody caudex and rhizome, its stem reaching about 60 centimeters in maximum height. It is sparsely to densely hairy in texture. The leaf blades are variable in shape, but are often divided deeply into several lobes. The inflorescence is a dense or loose array of several flowers. The flower has five petals in shades of bright to dark pink, often with white veining, and measuring one to over three centimeters in length.

Subspecies and endemics
There are over ten subspecies, some of which are endemic and rare:. They include:
Sidalcea malviflora ssp. californica — California checkerbloom.
Sidalcea malviflora ssp. dolosa — endemic to the San Bernardino Mountains.
Sidalcea malviflora ssp. laciniata
Sidalcea malviflora ssp. laciniata var. laciniata
Sidalcea malviflora ssp. laciniata var. sancta
Sidalcea malviflora ssp. malviflora  — Checker mallow 
Sidalcea malviflora ssp. patula — Siskiyou checkerbloom — endemic to far northwestern California and southwestern Oregon.
Sidalcea malviflora ssp. purpurea — Purple-stemmed checkerbloom — endemic to the California coast just north of the San Francisco Bay Area.
Sidalcea malviflora ssp. rostrata
Sidalcea malviflora ssp. virgata — Dwarf checkerbloom

Cultivation
Sidalcea malviflora is cultivated as an ornamental plant, for use in traditional, native plant, water conserving, and wildlife gardens.

Cultivars have been selected for flower colors and size qualities, they include:
Sidalcea malviflora 'Little Princess'
Sidalcea malviflora 'Palustre' — Palustre Checkerbloom — more compact and a heavier bloom produced.
Sidalcea malviflora 'Party Girl'
Sidalcea malviflora 'Rosanna' — Rosanna Checker Mallow

Ecology
It is a larval host to the West Coast lady.

See also
California chaparral and woodlands
California coastal sage and chaparral

References

External links
Calflora Database: Sidalcea malviflora (Checker bloom,  Wild Hollyhock, checker mallow, dwarf checkerbloom)
Jepson Manual Treatment: Sidalcea malviflora
USDA Plants Profile for Sidalcea malviflora
Sidalcea malviflora — U.C. Photo gallery

malviflora
Flora of California
Flora of Baja California
Flora of Oregon
Flora of the Cascade Range
Flora of the Klamath Mountains
Flora of the Sierra Nevada (United States)
Natural history of the California chaparral and woodlands
Natural history of the California Coast Ranges
Natural history of the Central Valley (California)
Natural history of the Channel Islands of California
Natural history of the Peninsular Ranges
Natural history of the San Francisco Bay Area
Natural history of the Santa Monica Mountains
Natural history of the Transverse Ranges
Garden plants of North America
Drought-tolerant plants